Qasemabad (also Romanized as Qāsemābād; also known as Tappeh Sorkh) is a village in Gol Banu Rural District, Pain Jam District, Torbat-e Jam County, Razavi Khorasan Province, Iran. In the 2006 Iranian census, its population was 217 in 39 families.

References 

Populated places in Torbat-e Jam County